AROUSE OSU is an Internet radio station run by students of Ohio State University, broadcasting exclusively online. AROUSE OSU is overseen by an executive board of Undergraduate students, and faculty from The Ohio State University's Department of Comparative Studies. The station's name is a backronym standing for "Amateur Radio Organization for Undergraduate Student Entertainment".

History
Student radio at Ohio State dates back to 1971, when then-WOSR began broadcasting from a mailing address at Drackett Tower. Mark Gunderson of The Evolution Control Committee accounts that the station folded in 1992.

In October 1995, KBUX (“The Underground”) began simulcasting on cable TV and 91.5FM. In 1998, the station began streaming online, and continued to do so until February 2001, when the FCC found its signal strength too high. The station continued its television broadcast on UNITS Channel 19 until folding in late 2002.

AROUSE OSU
In 2010, eight years after the fall of The Underground, students banded together to create the Amateur Radio Organization for Undergraduate Student Entertainment: a streaming-only station broadcasting from off-campus space. Without availability of an on-campus studio, the students relied on the generosity of local businesses to maintain broadcasting space.

From 2010 to 2016, AROUSE broadcast from Rendezvous Hair Salon, two miles north of Campus in the Old North district. After the building was struck by lightning, the students moved to famed High Street restaurant Buckeye Donuts.

After a brief relocation to Evolved Body Art in SoHud, the station moved back to Buckeye Donuts, where it would broadcast 24/7 in accordance with the restaurant's operating hours.

AROUSE currently has over 100 students on the organization roster, and 84 hours of programming each week.

In addition to the 24/7 broadcast, AROUSE publishes articles, reviews, and video specials on the first of each month of the academic year on their website.

Notable AROUSE guests include Chris Tomson (Vampire Weekend, Dams of the West),  James O'Reilly (CEO, Long John Silvers), Ron Gallo, and more.

References

External links
 Official Website
 Live Broadcast

Ohio State University
College radio stations in Ohio
Internet radio stations in the United States